Nick Farmer is a science fiction writer and linguist based in Oakland, California, United States. He is a polyglot able to speak in 14 languages. He had created 3 constructed languages for science fiction television series: Belter Creole for The Expanse, and Trill and Barzan for Star Trek: Discovery.

History

Youth and education 
Nick Farmer was inspired to become a linguist by his godfather, Kenneth L. Hale, and his mother, respectively a linguistics teacher at Massachusetts Institute of Technology and his student. As a child, he moved a couple of times, getting to grow up with a few different languages and dialects in his surroundings, eventually making him interested in linguistics. He studied linguistics at the Rutgers University and University of California in Berkeley. He also become a polyglot able to speak in 14 languages.

Constructed languages 
Around 2010, while in a bar, he met George R. R. Martin, the author of the A Song of Ice and Fire novel series, who then introduced him to Ty Franck, co-author of The Expanse novel series. Around 2014 and 2015, during the production of the first season of The Expanse television series, Farmer was commissioned to develop Belter Creole, the constructed language of one of the factions in the series. Franck was the one who suggested hiring Farmer.

Inside the universe of television series set around 200 years in the future, the language is used by Belters, the inhabitants of the asteroid belt and outer planets of the Solar System. The language had developed during the colonization of the Asteroid Belt, firstly starting as the pidgin spoken by people who came to the colonies from Earth speaking in various languages from all around the world. With next generations, the language had developed into the creole.

Developing the language, Farmer had modeled it as a creole based on English, with influence of other languages from all around the world, including Romance languages such as Spanish, French, Portuguese and Italian, Germanic languages such as German and Swedish, Slavic languages such as Polish, Russian and Ukrainian, as well as Japanese, Chinese, Persian, Arabic, Hebrew, Zulu and others. As the result of his work, Farmer had created over 1000 words for his language, adding more to the list if requested by the show's producers and fans.

In 2020, Farmer was commissioned to develop two constructed languages, Trill and Barzan, for the Star Trek: Discovery television series. The languages had appeared in the 2 episodes of the third season of the show.

Works

Novels 
The Survivors: A Novella (2017)

Short stories 
The Venusian (2018)

References 

American science fiction writers
20th-century American short story writers
American male short story writers
American male novelists
21st-century American novelists
21st-century American male writers
Constructed language creators
Writers from California
Novelists from California
People from Oakland, California
Multilingual writers
Living people
Year of birth missing (living people)